IV liga Cuyavia-Pomerania group (grupa kujawsko-pomorska) is one of the groups of IV liga, the 5th level of Polish football league system. The league was created in season 2000/2001 after introducing new administrative division of Poland. Until the end of the 2007/08 season IV liga was placed at 4th tier of league system but this was changed with the formation of the Ekstraklasa as the top-level league in Poland.
The clubs from Kuyavian-Pomeranian Voivodeship compete in this group. The winner of the league is promoted to III liga group II. The bottom teams are relegated to the groups of Liga okręgowa from Kuyavian-Pomeranian Voivodeship. These groups are Cuyavia-Pomerania I and Cuyavia-Pomerania II.

List of champions

Season 2000/01 
IV liga is placed at 4th level of Polish football league system until the end of 2007/08 season.
Cuyavia-Pomerania group was created with the following 18 clubs:
 relegated from III liga "Gdańsk-Warszawa" group: TKP Toruń.
 moved from "Bydgoszcz-Elbląg-Toruń" group: Brda Bydgoszcz, Kasztelan Papowo Biskupie, Legia Chełmża, Pomorzanin Toruń, Pomowiec Kijewo Królewskie, Promień Kowalewo Pomorskie, Szubinianka Szubin, Wda Świecie and Zawisza Bydgoszcz.
 moved from "Konin-Płock-Skierniewice-Włocławek" group: Jagiellonka Nieszawa, Lech Rypin, Start Radziejów, Zdrój Ciechocinek and Ziemowit Osięciny.
 promoted from Liga okręgowa: Polonia Bydgoszcz ("Bydgoszcz" group), Unia Wąbrzeźno ("Toruń" group) and  Włocłavia Włocławek ("Włocławek" group).

Final table:

Season 2001/02 
New clubs:
 relegated from III liga "Cuyavia/Pomerania-Greater Poland-Pomerania-West Pomerania" group: Mień Lipno (KP Zawisza Bygdoszcz was dissolved).
 promoted from Liga okręgowa: Unia Solec Kujawski and Victoria Koronowo ("Cuyavia-Pomerania I" group) and Kujawiak Włocławek ("Cuyavia-Pomerania II" group).
Final table:

 Zawisza Bydgoszcz merged with Chemik Bydgoszcz before the season to form Zawisza/Chemik Bydgoszcz (reserve team of Chemik/Zawisza Bydgoszcz).

Season 2002/03 
League reduced to 16 teams.
New clubs:
 relegated from III liga "Cuyavia/Pomerania-Greater Poland-Pomerania-West Pomerania" group: Goplania Inowrocław.
 promoted from Liga okręgowa: Wisła Nowe ("Cuyavia-Pomerania I" group) and  LTP Lubanie and Pałuczanka Żnin ("Cuyavia-Pomerania II" group).
Final table:

 Jagiellonka Nieszawa refused to play in III liga. Eventually the club withdrew also from IV liga after the season.

Season 2003/04 
New clubs:
 relegated from III liga "Cuyavia/Pomerania-Greater Poland-Pomerania-West Pomerania" group: Sparta Brodnica and TKP Toruń.
 promoted from Liga okręgowa: Zawisza/Chemik Bydgoszcz ("Cuyavia-Pomerania I" group),  Cuiavia Inowrocław and Zdrój Ciechocinek ("Cuyavia-Pomerania II" group).
Final table:

Season 2004/05 
New clubs:
 relegated from III liga "Cuyavia/Pomerania-Greater Poland-Pomerania-West Pomerania" group: None (Polonia Bydgoszcz was relegated to Liga okręgowa).
 promoted from Liga okręgowa: Olimpia Grudziądz ("Cuyavia-Pomerania I" group), Goplania Inowrocław and Sadownik Waganiec ("Cuyavia-Pomerania II" group).
Final table:

Season 2005/06 
New clubs:
 relegated from III liga "Cuyavia/Pomerania-Greater Poland-Pomerania-West Pomerania" group: None.
 promoted from Liga okręgowa: Unia Solec Kujawski ("Cuyavia-Pomerania I" group), Pogoń Mogilno and Sparta Janowiec Wielkopolski ("Cuyavia-Pomerania II" group).
Final table:

 Zawisza Bydgoszcz lost 6 points for bribery attempts in two matches.

Season 2006/07 
New clubs:
 relegated from III liga "Cuyavia/Pomerania-Greater Poland-Pomerania-West Pomerania" group: Chemik Bydgoszcz.
 promoted from Liga okręgowa: Pomorzanin Serock ("Cuyavia-Pomerania I" group), Kujawiak Włocławek and Notecianka Pakość ("Cuyavia-Pomerania II" group).
Final table:

Season 2007/08 
New clubs:
 promoted from Liga okręgowa: Zawisza/Gwiazda Bydgoszcz ("Cuyavia-Pomerania I" group), Kujawiak Kowal and LTP Lubanie ("Cuyavia-Pomerania II" group).
Final table:

 Zawisza/Gwiazda Bydgoszcz changed name into Gwiazda Bydgoszcz
 Zawisza Bydgoszcz was promoted to II liga (new third level of Polish football league system) after winning play-off.
 Teams from places 2-8 were promoted to new created III liga but in fact stayed on 4th level (Mień Lipno lost play-off  but finally was promoted after withdrawing of Kujawiak Włocławek from playing in new III liga).
 Teams from places 9-15 stayed in IV liga but in fact they were moved to the 5th level.
 Sadownik Waganiec withdrew after the season.

Season 2008/09 
IV liga became the fifth level of Polish football league system due to the formation of Ekstraklasa as the top-level league in Poland.
New clubs:
 promoted from Liga okręgowa: Czarni Nakło nad Notecią, Grom Osie, Promień Kowalewo Pomorskie, Unia Wąbrzeźno and Wda Świecie ("Cuyavia-Pomerania I" group), Dąb Barcin, Sparta Janowiec Wielkopolski, Start Radziejów and Ziemowit Osięciny ("Cuyavia-Pomerania II" group).
Final table:

Season 2009/10 
New clubs:
 relegated from III liga "Cuyavia/Pomerania-Greater Poland" group: Chemik Bydgoszcz (Mień Lipno witdhrew from playing in IV liga).
 promoted from Liga okręgowa: Flisak Złotoria and Unifreeze Miesiączkowo ("Cuyavia-Pomerania I" group), Cuiavia Inowrocław and Unia Gniewkow  ("Cuyavia-Pomerania II" group).
Final table:

 Unifreeze Miesiączkowo withdrew after the season due to the merge with Sparta Brodnica.
 Gwiazda Bydgoszcz withdrew after the season.

Season 2010/11 
New clubs:
 relegated from III liga "Cuyavia/Pomerania-Greater Poland" group: Goplania Inowrocław,  Legia Chełmża and Zdrój Ciechocinek.
 promoted from Liga okręgowa: Chełminianka Chełmno and Krajna Sępólno Krajeńskie ("Cuyavia-Pomerania I" group), Noteć Łabiszyn and Pogoń Mogilno ("Cuyavia-Pomerania II" group).
Final table:

 Sparta Brodnica merged with Unifreeze Miesiączkowo before the season to form Sparta/Unifreeze Brodnica.

Season 2011/12 
New clubs:
 relegated from III liga "Cuyavia/Pomerania-Greater Poland" group: Unia Solec Kujawski and Włocłavia Włocławek.
 promoted from Liga okręgowa: Pomorzanin Toruń and Start Warlubie ("Cuyavia-Pomerania I" group),  Gopło Kruszwica and Szubinianka Szubin ("Cuyavia-Pomerania II" group).
Final table:

Season 2012/13 
New clubs:
 relegated from III liga "Cuyavia/Pomerania-Greater Poland" group:Victoria Koronowo witdhrew from playing in IV liga Sparta Brodnica and Unia Janikowo.
 promoted from Liga okręgowa: Polonia Bydgoszcz and Zawisza II Bydgoszcz ("Cuyavia-Pomerania I" group), Kujawianka Izbica Kujawska and Mień Lipno ("Cuyavia-Pomerania II" group).
Final table:

 Unia Janikowo lost 10 points for corruption charges in 2004/2005 season (in III liga).
 Unia Janikowo withdrew after 18th round.

Season 2013/14 
New clubs:
 relegated from II liga "West" group: Lech Rypin.
 promoted from Liga okręgowa: Chełminianka Chełmno and Promień Kowalewo Pomorskie ("Cuyavia-Pomerania I" group), Piast Złotniki Kujawskie and Zdrój Ciechocinek ("Cuyavia-Pomerania II" group).
Final table:

 Krajna Sępólno Krajeńskie withdrew in mid-season.

Season 2014/15 
New clubs:
 relegated from III liga "Cuyavia/Pomerania-Greater Poland" group: Cuiavia Inowrocław, Elana Toruń and Notecianka Pakość.
 promoted from Liga okręgowa: Olimpia II Grudziądz and ROL.KO Konojady ("Cuyavia-Pomerania I" group), LTP Lubanie and Orlęta Aleksandrów Kujawski ("Cuyavia-Pomerania II" group).

Final table:

 Grom Osie withdrew after the season.

Season 2015/16 
New clubs:
 relegated from III liga "Cuyavia/Pomerania-Greater Poland" group:  Chełminianka Chełmno,  Pogoń Mogilno, Unia Solec Kujawski and Włocłavia Włocławek.
 promoted from Liga okręgowa:  Chemik Bydgoszcz and Naprzód Jabłonowo Pomorskie ("Cuyavia-Pomerania I" group), Łokietek Brześć Kujawski and Sadownik Waganiec ("Cuyavia-Pomerania II" group).
Final table:

 ROL.KO Konojady refused to play in III liga. Eventually the club withdrew also from IV liga after the season.
 Zawisza II Bydgoszcz withdrew after the season.

Season 2016/17 
League expanded to 18 teams.
New clubs:
 relegated from III liga "Cuyavia/Pomerania-Greater Poland" group: Kujawianka Izbica Kujawska, Sparta Brodnica and Start Warlubie.
 promoted from Liga okręgowa: Legia Chełmża and Wisła Nowe ("Cuyavia-Pomerania I" group), Gopło Kruszwica and Unia Janikowo ("Cuyavia-Pomerania II" group).
Final table:

 Sadownik Waganiec withdrew in mid-season.

Season 2017/18 
New clubs:
 relegated from III liga group 2: Chemik Bydgoszcz.
 promoted from Liga okręgowa: Polonia Bydgoszcz and Sokół Radomin ("Cuyavia-Pomerania I" group), Kujawiak Kowal and Lider Włocławek ("Cuyavia-Pomerania II" group).
Final table:

 Start Warlubie withdrew after the season.

Season 2018/19 
New clubs:
 relegated from III liga group 2: Unia Solec Kujawski.
 promoted from Liga okręgowa: BKS Bydgoszcz and Pomorzanin Toruń ("Cuyavia-Pomerania I" group), Unia Gniewkowo and Włocłavia Włocławek ("Cuyavia-Pomerania II" group).
Final table:

Season 2019/20 
New clubs:
 relegated from III liga group 2:Wda Świecie refused to play in IV liga Chemik Bydgoszcz.
 promoted from Liga okręgowa: Sportis Łochowo and Zawisza Bydgoszcz ("Cuyavia-Pomerania I" group), Lider Włocławek and Piast Złotniki Kujawskie ("Cuyavia-Pomerania II" group).
Final table  (due to COVID-19 pandemic league was ended after 17th round):

Season 2020/21 

Final table:After the 18th round the clubs were divided into two groups: promotion (teams 1–7) and relegation (8-19). 
In the second part of the season: the clubs in promotion group played two matches against each team in this group and the clubs in relegation group played only one match against each team in this group.

Season 2021/22 
League reduced to 18 teams.
New clubs:
 relegated from III liga group 2: Pomorzanin Toruń.
 promoted from Liga okręgowa: Unia Solec Kujawski ("Cuyavia-Pomerania I" group) and Notecianka Pakość ("Cuyavia-Pomerania II" group).
Final table:
TBA

All-time table 
The table that follows is accurate as of the end of the 2020/21 season. It includes the clubs that played at least one match (even annulled) in IV liga Cuyavia-Pomerania group since 2000/01 season.
Blue colour means that the club plays in IV liga in the current 2021/22 season.
Green colour means that the club plays higher than IV liga in the current 2021/22 season.
Dark grey colour means that the club does not play in any league in the current 2021/22 season.

 Zawisza Bydgoszcz lost 6 points for bribery attempts in two matches in 2005/06 season.
 Unia Janikowo lost 10 points in 2012/13 season for corruption charges in 2004/2005 season.
NOTE: County without any club in IV liga: Tuchola.

Locations of the clubs 
Locations of all clubs playing in IV liga Cuyavia-Pomerania group:

References

Football leagues in Poland
Kuyavian-Pomeranian Voivodeship